Oikawa is a Japanese surname. Notable people with the surname include:

, Japanese film director
, Japanese fencer
, Japanese figure skater and journalist
, Imperial Japanese Navy admiral
, Japanese actress, television personality and AV idol
, Japanese astronomer
, Japanese motorcycle racer
, Japanese field hockey player
, Japanese shogi player
, Japanese sumo wrestler
, Japanese speed skater
, Japanese volleyball player. Currently playing as setter in UPCN San Juan (Serie A1) at the league level, as well as on the Argentina National Volleyball Team

Fictional characters
, a character in the manga series Moyasimon: Tales of Agriculture
, a character in the anime film Fireworks
, a character in the manga series Haikyu!!
, a character in the manga series Nurarihyon no Mago
, a character in the anime series Digimon Adventure

See also
Zacco platypus (オイカワ、追河)
2667 Oikawa, outer main-belt asteroid
Oikawa Station, a railway station in Yugawa, Kawanuma District, Fukushima Prefecture, Japan

Japanese-language surnames